UFC 36: Worlds Collide was a mixed martial arts event held by the Ultimate Fighting Championship at the MGM Grand Arena in Las Vegas, Nevada on March 22, 2002. The event was seen live on pay per view in the United States, and later released on home video.

History
The card was headlined by two title bouts, a Heavyweight Championship bout between Randy Couture and Josh Barnett and a Welterweight title bout between Matt Hughes and Hayato Sakurai. UFC 36 marked the last UFC appearance of former 170 lb Champion Pat Miletich, and the last appearance of Pete Williams. Miletich decided to concentrate on training his fighters, including Matt Hughes who was now the UFC champion in Pat's preferred weight class. 

Hughes was originally supposed to fight then-current Shooto welterweight champion, and future UFC Middleweight Champion Anderson Silva. However, Silva had signed a contract with PRIDE Fighting Championships.

Barnett defeated Couture via TKO (strikes) at 4:32 of the second round to become the new UFC Heavyweight Champion. Afterwards, Barnett was stripped of the title when he tested positive for steroids during a mandatory post-fight drug test.

Nine past or future UFC champions competed on this card (including at least one in each bout), more than any other event in UFC history.

Results

See also
 Ultimate Fighting Championship
 List of UFC champions
 List of UFC events
 2002 in UFC

References

External links
 Official UFC website
 Sherdog.com
 UFC36 fights review

Ultimate Fighting Championship events
2002 in mixed martial arts
Mixed martial arts in Las Vegas
2002 in sports in Nevada
MGM Grand Garden Arena